Almet Francis Jenks (May 21, 1853 – September 18, 1924) was an American lawyer and politician from New York.

Life
He graduated from Yale University in 1875, where he was a member of Skull and Bones, and earned a Bachelor of Laws from Columbia University in 1877. He was a justice of the New York Supreme Court from 1896 to 1921, and was Presiding Justice (1911–12, 1912–1921) and Justice (1905–11) of the Appellate Division, Second Dept. In 1916, he ran on the Democratic and Independence League tickets for Chief Judge of the New York Court of Appeals but was defeated by Republican/Progressive Frank H. Hiscock.

His son Almet Francis Jenks, Jr. (1892–1966) was author of The Huntsman at the Gate (1952) and The Second Chance (1959).

References

1853 births
1924 deaths
New York Supreme Court Justices
Yale University alumni
Columbia Law School alumni
Burials at Green-Wood Cemetery
New York (state) Democrats